Txomin is a  Basque translation of the name Dominic.

People with the name
 Txomin Acedo (1898–1980), Spanish footballer 
 Txomin Artola, of the band Haizea
 Txomin Juaristi (born 1995), Spanish cyclist
 Txomin Larrainzar (born 1969), Spanish footballer 
 Txomin Nagore (born 1974), Spanish footballer 
 Txomin Peillen (1932–2022), French writer, linguist, and biologist
 Txomin Perurena (born 1943), Spanish cyclist

Fictional characters
 Txomin, in video game Aidyn Chronicles: The First Mage

See also
Domingo (name)

Basque masculine given names